|}

The Fred Darling Stakes is a Group 3 flat horse race in Great Britain open to three-year-old fillies. It is run over a distance of 7 furlongs at Newbury in April.

History
The event was established in 1949, and it was initially called the Lambourn Stakes. It was named after Lambourn, a nearby village associated with racehorse training.

For a period the race was contested over 7 furlongs and 60 yards. It continued with its original name until 1954, and was given its present title in 1955. It was renamed in memory of Fred Darling, a successful local trainer who died two years earlier.

The Dubai Duty Free company started to sponsor the Fred Darling Stakes in 1996. From this point the race was also known as the Dubai Duty Free Stakes. It used to be run on a left-handed course, but it was switched to a straight 7 furlongs in 1999.

The race can serve as a trial for various fillies' Classics in Europe. The last participant to win the 1,000 Guineas was Lahan, the fourth-placed horse in 2000.

Records

Leading jockey (4 wins):
 Lester Piggott – Sijui (1957), Royal Saint (1967), Durtal (1977), Millingdale Lillie (1980)
 Jimmy Lindley – Soldier's Song (1960), Anassa (1962), Night Appeal (1965), Highest Hopes (1970)
 Walter Swinburn – Marwell (1981), Top Socialite (1985), Maysoon (1986), Sueboog (1993)
 Willie Carson – Salsabil (1990), Shadayid (1991), Bulaxie (1994), Aqaarid (1995)

Leading trainer (6 wins):
 Noel Murless – Serocco (1950), Refreshed (1952), Sijui (1957), Royal Saint (1967), Sea Lavender (1969), Mysterious (1973)
 John Dunlop – Salsabil (1990), Shadayid (1991), Bulaxie (1994), Aqaarid (1995), Iftiraas (2000), Muthabara (2008)

Winners

See also
 Horse racing in Great Britain
 List of British flat horse races
 Recurring sporting events established in 1949 – this race is included under its original title, Lambourn Stakes.

References

 Paris-Turf:
 Racing Post:

 galopp-sieger.de – Fred Darling Stakes (ex Lambourn Stakes).
 ifhaonline.org – International Federation of Horseracing Authorities – Fred Darling Stakes (2019).
 pedigreequery.com – Fred Darling Stakes – Newbury.
 

Flat horse races for three-year-old fillies
Newbury Racecourse
Flat races in Great Britain
1949 establishments in England